The 1912 Milan–San Remo was the sixth edition of the Milan–San Remo cycle race and was held on 31 March 1912. The race started in Milan and finished in San Remo. The race was won by Henri Pélissier.

General classification

References

1912
1912 in road cycling
1912 in Italian sport
March 1912 sports events